Circleville School is a historic school building located at Circleville, Pendleton County, West Virginia. It was designed by architect Ernest C. S. Holmboe and built in 1937–1938, as a project of the federal Works Progress Administration (WPA). The two-story masonry building is in the Georgian Revival style.  It was built on the foundation of a previous school destroyed by fire.  The front facade features a two-story pedimented projecting pavilion emphasized by large Doric order pilasters.  It is constructed of hollow tile block with a red brick veneer. The truncated hipped roof is topped by a wooden cupola.

Construction of the school was authorized by Franklin Delano Roosevelt in May 1937,  making it one of the last buildings, if not the last building, constructed through the WPA. It was listed on the National Register of Historic Places in 1995.

Today the school functions as a community center. It houses a commercial kitchen, workout center, and a few small businesses. It is also used for community events such as square dances and Chamber of Commerce dinners.

References

Colonial Revival architecture in West Virginia
Defunct schools in West Virginia
Former school buildings in the United States
Georgian Revival architecture in West Virginia
School buildings completed in 1938
Schools in Pendleton County, West Virginia
School buildings on the National Register of Historic Places in West Virginia
Works Progress Administration in West Virginia
National Register of Historic Places in Pendleton County, West Virginia